Andrew Norman (born 27 June 1980) is an English former professional snooker player from Bristol.

Career 
Norman turned professional in 2001. He progressed up the ranking list between 2005 and 2007, jumping 30 places. His consistency was epitomised in 2006 as he lost his opening match in just one of the seven ranking events and had his best result in Aberdeen at the Royal London Watches Grand Prix when he reached the last 16 before losing to the eventual winner, Neil Robertson. Norman works as a part-time van driver for his sponsor Hills Delivery during the summer. In 2009, he was ranked 75 in the World Rankings, however, since then he fell out of the top 100. On 16 May 2011, he won a qualifying game at the Snooker Q School to regain his tour card for the 2011–12 season.

Norman would need to win four qualifying matches to reach the main draws of the ranking events in the new season. He came closest to doing so in the first two events of the year, the Australian Goldfields Open and the Shanghai Masters, where on both occasions he won two matches before losing in the third qualifying round. His performances throughout the season were not enough to see him enter the top 64 in the world rankings who retain their places for the 2012–13 season and dropped off the main tour.

Norman could only enter Players Tour Championship events in the 2012/2013 season. He took part in 10 of them with his best finish coming in the European Tour Event 1 in Germany where he beat Ben Harrison, Nigel Bond, Phil Barnes and top 16 player Ricky Walden, before losing to Joe Swail 3–4 in the quarter-finals. It was this result which largely contributed to him finishing 57th on the Order of Merit to claim one of the eight spots on offer to players not on the main tour for the next season.

Norman did not win a match at the venue of a full ranking event during the 2013–14 season. He played in seven of the eight European Tour tournaments with his best results being three last 32 defeats to be placed 60th on the Order of Merit and 110th in the world rankings. Norman won only one match during the 2014–15 season, and following a 10–2 loss against Tom Ford at the 2015 World Championship qualifiers he decided to retire from professional snooker to concentrate on his coaching work at the South West Snooker Academy.

Performance and rankings timeline

Career finals

Non-ranking finals: 2 (1 title)

Pro-am finals: 3 (3 titles)

Amateur finals: 2

References 

1980 births
Living people
English snooker players
Place of birth missing (living people)
Sportspeople from Bristol